Long Middle School can refer to:
 Dan F. Long Middle School, in Carrollton-Farmers Branch Independent School District, Dallas, Texas
 J.L. Long Middle School, in Dallas Independent School District, Dallas, Texas
 Jane Long Middle School (Houston), in Houston Independent School District, Houston, Texas
 Jane Long Middle School, in Bryan Independent School District, Bryan, Texas
 Long County Middle School, in Long County School District, Ludowici, Georgia